The Liu Hsing-chin Comic Museum is a museum about the comics creator Liu Hsing-chin, located in Hengshan Township, Hsinchu County, Taiwan.

History
The museum building used to be the old administration building of the Taiwan Railways Administration. With the help from Jiuzantou Cultural Association, funding was secured from the Council for Cultural Affairs to transform the old building to a comic wonderland. The museum opened in March 2005.

Transportation
The museum is accessible within walking distance west from Neiwan Station of the Taiwan Railways.

See also
 List of museums in Taiwan

References

2005 establishments in Taiwan
Biographical museums in Taiwan
Cartooning museums
Literary museums in Taiwan
Museums established in 2005
Museums in Hsinchu County